Bruno Carabetta (born 27 July 1966 in Mulhouse, Haut-Rhin) is a retired male judoka from France, who competed for his native country at the 1988 Summer Olympics in Seoul, South Korea. There he won the bronze medal in the Men's Half-Lightweight (– 65 kg) division after being defeated in the semi-finals by South Korea's eventual gold medalist Lee Kyung-Keun.

External links
 
 sports-reference

1966 births
Living people
Sportspeople from Mulhouse
French male judoka
Judoka at the 1988 Summer Olympics
Judoka at the 1992 Summer Olympics
Olympic judoka of France
Olympic bronze medalists for France
Olympic medalists in judo
French people of Italian descent
Medalists at the 1988 Summer Olympics